Voloshinov, Волошинов (feminine: Voloshinova) is a Russian surname. Notable people with the surname include:

 Valentin Voloshinov (1895–1936) Soviet and Russian linguist
 Vitaly Voloshinov (1947–2019), Soviet and Russian physicist

Russian-language surnames